Hapana minima is a species of moth of the family Thyrididae. It is found in Cameroon, Mozambique and Angola.

They have a wing length of 6.5 mm and are the smallest moths of the genus Hapana.

References

Thyrididae
Lepidoptera of Angola
Lepidoptera of Cameroon
Lepidoptera of Mozambique
Moths of Sub-Saharan Africa
Moths described in 1971